Robert Virtue (14 January 1867 – 6 November 1930) was a New Zealand cricketer. He played in one first-class match for Wellington in 1891/92.

See also
 List of Wellington representative cricketers

References

External links
 

1867 births
1930 deaths
New Zealand cricketers
Wellington cricketers
People from Hokitika